WSJP-FM (100.1 FM) is a radio station licensed to Port Washington, Wisconsin, and licensed to Relevant Radio, Inc. It airs Catholic-based religious programming in a simulcast with WSJP (1640 AM). It is the only full-power radio station licensed to a community in Ozaukee County.

History
Prior to Starboard's purchase of the station, 100.1 was WGLB-FM, which aired a variety of programming over the years, including country, Top 40 and 70s hits. Most of these formats were also simulcast on its former AM sister station, WGLB (1560 AM).

For a time, WGLB-FM carried various satellite-delivered syndicated formats, but in later years were mostly live and local. The slogan was "Retro Radio". They briefly carried Don Imus's syndicated morning talk radio show in the late 1990s. The stations languished at the bottom of the Milwaukee area ratings due to its location and limited signal, which did not penetrate the southern half of Milwaukee County, though it maintained a small and dedicated fanbase in the market for its formats and program choices unique for the market.

WGLB-FM was owned by Joel Kinlow until he sold the station to Starboard. WGLB-FM signed off the air on May 21, 2003 and following a station upgrade, WPJP officially debuted on August 22, 2003. Kinlow continued to own 1560 AM, which retains the WGLB call sign and airs a gospel music format. WPJP's calls changed to WSJP on March 17, 2014, just over a month before Pope John Paul II, the station's namesake, was canonized as a saint on April 27 of the same year.

WSJP-FM airs much of the national content of Relevant Radio, but also airs some local programming, including Milwaukee Archbishop Jerome Listecki's Sunday Mass, and Marquette Golden Eagles men's basketball.

External links

SJP-FM
SJP-FM
Catholic radio stations
Radio stations established in 1969
1969 establishments in Wisconsin
Relevant Radio stations